Thomas Trevelyan (born April 8, 1949) is a Canadian former professional ice hockey centre who played 20 games during the 1974–75 WHA season with the San Diego Mariners of the World Hockey Association. As a youth, he played in the 1961 Quebec International Pee-Wee Hockey Tournament with the Scarboro Lions.

References

External links
 

1949 births
Canadian ice hockey centres
Charlotte Checkers (EHL) players
Hamilton Red Wings (OHA) players
Living people
Quebec Aces (AHL) players
Richmond Robins players
San Diego Gulls (WHL) players
San Diego Mariners players
Seattle Totems (WHL) players
Ice hockey people from Toronto
Syracuse Blazers players